Na-young, also spelled Na-yeong, is a Korean feminine given name. Its meaning differs based on the hanja used to write each syllable of the name. There are 16 hanja with the reading "na" and 34 hanja with the reading "young" on the South Korean government's official list of hanja which may be registered for use in given names.

People with this name include:

Film and television
Nam Na-yeong (born 1971), South Korean film editor
Lee Na-young (born 1979), South Korean actress
Kim Na-young (television personality) (born 1981), South Korean television personality
Seo Seung-ah (born Lee Na-young, 1983), South Korean actress

Musicians
Na-Young Jeon (born 1989), Dutch-South Korean actress and singer
Kim Na-young (singer) (born 1991), South Korean singer and actress
Lim Na-young (born 1995), South Korean singer and actress, former member of girl groups I.O.I and Pristin

Sportspeople
Kim Na-young (judoka) (born 1988), South Korean judoka
Kim Na-young (figure skater) (born 1990), South Korean figure skater
Kim Na-young (badminton, born 1991), South Korean badminton player
Kim Na-young (badminton, born 1995), South Korean badminton player

Others
Kim Nayoung (born 1966), South Korean artist, member of the collaborative art duo Gregory Maass & Nayoungim
Kim Na-young (born  2000), alias of the victim in the 2008 Cho Doo-soon case

See also
List of Korean given names

References

Korean feminine given names